Aeolodermus emarginatus is a species of beetles in the family Carabidae, the only species in the genus Aeolodermus.

References

Lebiinae
Monotypic Carabidae genera